The International Israelite Board of Rabbis is a Black Hebrew Israelite organization in the United States that represents congregations in the United States, the Caribbean, and Africa.

History
The board was founded in 1970 by students of Wentworth Arthur Matthew. The board has its roots the Commandment Keepers.

Since 2015, Capers Funnye has served as the Chief Rabbi for the organization.

Relationship with Rabbinic Judaism
Black Hebrew Israelites are not considered Jewish by Jews, but have long sought recognition from the Jewish community. The International Israelite Board of Rabbis is not recognized by the New York Board of Rabbis, which represents Rabbinic Judaism in New York City.

The Black Orthodox Jewish writer and activist Shais Rishon has written that the International Israelite Board of Rabbis is not a Jewish organization, rejecting their use of their word "rabbi". According to Rishon, Wentworth A. Matthew, Levi Ben Levy and others associated with the board never "belonged nor converted to any branch of Judaism", with the exceptions of Capers Funnye and Eli Aronoff.

See also
African-American Jews
Black Hebrew Israelites

References

External links
International Israelite Board of Rabbis

1970 establishments in the United States